Hawke is a character from BioWare's Dragon Age media franchise, first appearing as the player character of the 2011 video game Dragon Age II. Hawke is the eldest child of the human Hawke family and hails from the nation of Ferelden in the world of Thedas, the setting of the Dragon Age franchise. The opening sequence of Dragon Age II follows Hawke's family as they flee northwards to the Free Marches region as refugees from the invading Darkspawn hordes. Settling down in the city-state of Kirkwall soon after arrival, Hawke emerges as a prominent figure within the span of a decade, rising in power and influence to become the "Champion of Kirkwall". Hawke is a pivotal figure behind the origins of the worldwide conflict between the setting's magicians ("Mage" within series fiction) and their custodians the Templar Order, and also plays an important role during a subsequent extradimensional invasion of Thedas by demonic beings as depicted in Dragon Age: Inquisition.

Hawke's gender, class, first name and facial appearance is defined by the player during the character creation menu. The character's core personality, political affiliations, and personal relationships with companion characters is gradually shaped by the player's cumulative choices and actions over the course of the game's narrative. However, Hawke has a distinct origin story and character arc within the narrative of Dragon Age II, and is neither a hero nor a villain as the game has no morality system. British actors Nicholas Boulton and Jo Wyatt voiced the male and female Hawke respectively. A version of the character who is male and a mage was featured prominently in marketing and promotional material for Dragon Age II.

Overall reception towards Hawke, much like Dragon Age II itself, was initially divisive. Several critics have retrospectively analyzed Hawke as an atypical and tragic video game protagonist who is not meant to be empowered with full agency over the narrative of Dragon Age II, finding merit in BioWare's creative vision for the character.

Character overview
"Hawke" is the eldest child of the renegade Ferelden mage Malcolm Hawke and the Free Marcher noblewoman Leandra Amell. During character creation in Dragon Age II, the player decides Hawke's gender, character class, and given name. If played as a warrior or rogue, Hawke would have been part of the Ferelden army at Ostagar alongside their brother Carver. If played as a mage, Hawke is an apostate mage who, like their sister Bethany, has managed to evade the Chantry religious institution and its Templars while growing up in the Ferelden village of Lothering. Hawke's choice of class determines whether Bethany (for warriors and rogues) or Carver (for mages) survive the journey from Ferelden to Kirkwall, the hometown of their mother Leandra Amell. Hawke's physical appearance is fully customizable, which also influences the facial structure, skin tone, and hair for Hawke's family members except for Charade Amell, the daughter of Hawke's uncle Gamlen Amell who is said to resemble her mother. Later in the game, the player's choices also determine Hawke's overall personality, combat specialization, and political affiliation. 

The player is given paraphrased dialogue options of fully voiced dialogue via a radial command menu called the "dialogue wheel", which will be expanded on when clicked. Over the course of Dragon Age II, Hawke can exhibit one of three personality types, which is achieved through cumulative dialogue choices favored by the player. The tone of Hawke's voice will be decided by their personality type whenever the character is not directly controlled by the player, which will happen during cut-scenes and also during conversations between the player's dialogue choices. Each of the three established personality types unlocks additional dialogue options for the player when dealing with non-player characters. For example, a Hawke player character with a sarcastic personality has access to a big range of humorous dialogue options.

Players of Dragon Age: Inquisition have the option to customize their version of Hawke, either through Dragon Age Keep or the in-game character creation menu.

Concept and design
The 1998 computer role-playing video game Planescape: Torment served as an important source of inspiration for Dragon Age II lead writer David Gaider's plans for the game's story and characters. Hawke was originally developed early in the production of Dragon Age II as a magician type character the development team dubbed "Biker Mage". According to BioWare Art Director Matt Rhodes, a staff member working in the visual development team "ended up being a launch pad for our protagonist". In a departure from the narrative of its predecessor, 2009's Dragon Age: Origins, Hawke's personal story arc is the driving force behind the narrative of Dragon Age II as opposed to an epic quest to repel a monstrous invasion slay and an ancient evil. Players get to determine Hawke's "history, relationships, and regrets" through their actions and choices across the game's ten year timeline. Gaider described Dragon Age II approach towards storytelling to be novelistic: with an unreliable narrator who picks and chooses what aspects of Hawke's life story he wants to tell, the relationship dynamics with companion characters is presented in a more "organic and natural" manner without lengthy exposition, and Kirkwall is immediately more reactive to Hawke’s presence. 

Unlike the silent protagonist approach adopted by Origins, Hawke was designed to be a fully voiced player character. This was intended to create a deeper, more cinematic feel for Dragon Age II story and dialogue. Unlike many other role-playing game protagonists, Hawke is not meant to be a blank slate character as some aspects of his or her backstory and cultural background are set, though players may choose their character's class and customize their appearance. This concept is akin to Commander Shepard from the Mass Effect series, where non-player characters commonly refer to the player character by their last name, allowing for a distinct identity which could be crafted outside of the text players see on-screen. Gaider described Hawke as neither a "totally defined character", nor a malleable avatar for players of Dragon Age II. He acknowledged that the developers may be "stepping on the player’s toes a little bit" as soon as a voiced player character is introduced, as such characters are not a complete extension of the player's thoughts and feelings, but referred to Planescape: Torment as an example where a fully voiced player character, The Nameless One, is embraced by players who could feel agency with regards to his life choices, even though they do not get to decide or define who the character is.

Voice
The male and female versions of Hawke were voiced by Nicholas Boulton and Jo Wyatt respectively. Boulton has worked with BioWare on other projects, including minor roles in Origins as well as Mass Effect: Andromeda where he played a major supporting character named Reyes. 

Boulton played Dragon Age II to familiarize himself with the job, but never completed his playthrough. With regards to playing a lead character in a video game that is meant to embody the disparate gameplay choices made by a player, Boulton said he kept a good sense of where he would be in his neutral or natural state and from there, he would "branch out" emotionally when acting out various lines from Hawke's three distinct personalities. To Boulton, acting out each of Hawke's different lines in different tones was about "finding a different part of that character" in how he would express himself if he had experienced a particularly extraordinary set of circumstances, as opposed to a different characterization entirely. Boulton found his reprisal the role for Inquisition to be a different experience, as Hawke is meant to be older, wiser and "more damaged" by the events of Inquisition. He also found a poignancy to the working experience which he found enjoyable, as he felt that it was like meeting an old friend or "putting the skin on again".

Cut content
As a result of the rushed developmental cycle of Dragon Age II, a substantial amount of content involving Hawke were cut before the final release of the game. In April 2021, Gaider revealed in a series of tweets uploaded to his personal Twitter account that he would have liked to have restored all alternate or contextual dialogue lines by non-player characters, which were dependent whether they had prior interactions with Hawke and if Hawke had any qualities that resonate with them. A major unused storyline involved a mage version of Hawke's struggle to withstand demonic possession while being trapped in his or her own mind, a situation that often confronts individuals with magical abilities in the Dragon Age setting. Gaider noted that "Hawke is the only mage who apparently never struggles with this" within the narrative of Dragon Age, and it is a character arc he deeply regretted being cut from the final game. Gaider would also have liked to include a third option where Hawke remains neutral and sides with neither the Mages or Templars.

Appearances

Dragon Age II
The story of Dragon Age II is told through flashbacks from the perspective of Varric Tethras, one of Hawke's companions who relates Hawke's life story to  his interrogator, Cassandra Pentaghast,  who is trying to locate Hawke's whereabouts and determine their role behind the war between the Mages and Templars of Thedas. A few days after the disastrous Battle of Ostagar, the Hawke family flees Lothering from the Darkspawn hordes. Although one of Hawke's siblings is killed by the Darkspawn, the group is saved by the timely intervention of the Witch of the Wilds, Flemeth. Alongside a fellow survivor named Aveline Vallen, the Hawke family travel across the Waking Sea to the Free Marches, arriving at the city of Kirkwall to search for their maternal relatives, the Amell family. Upon arrival at Kirkwall however, the group find themselves outside the city gates, which are overwhelmed by other Blight refugees. The group locates Leandra's brother Gamlen Amell, who reveals that he along with the Amell family fortune had fallen into financial ruin. Hawke has no choice but to raise funds to pay the bribe that the group needs to enter the city, where they take up residence in Gamlen's small dilapidated house in the impoverished Lowtown district.

One year later, Varric approaches the Hawkes and enlist them for a risky but potentially prosperous treasure hunting expedition into the perilous region of the Deep Roads, taking advantage of the Fifth Blight's recent end and the consequent reduction of Darkspawn in the Deep Roads. After raising enough capital and enlisting the aid of Anders, a renegade mage and former Grey Warden who is familiar with the Deep Roads, the group set off for their expedition. Hawke survives the perilous expedition but gains enough personal fame and wealth to buy back the old Amell mansion in Hightown. 

Three years later, Hawke is asked by the Viscount of Kirkwall, Marlowe Dumar, to deal with the Qunari, who were shipwrecked in Kirkwall three years before and have occupied a city quarter ever since. In the midst of escalating tensions between the Qunari and the residents of Kirkwall, an anti-Qunari faction attempts to purge the Qunari from the city, while dissidents and criminals join the Qunari to evade law enforcement. Personal tragedy later strikes Hawke when Leandra is abducted by a serial killer who prey on Kirkwall's women using blood magic, a forbidden branch of magic. Hawke finds and kills the murderer, but too late to save Leandra. Hawke vows to find out the identity of the serial killer's accomplice, "O".  Hawke eventually discovers the real reason behind the Qunari presence in Kirkwall, but their military leader the Arishok decides to attack Kirkwall and executes the Viscount. Hawke's is declared the Champion of Kirkwall after successfully retaking Kirkwall from the Qunari.

Following the death of Viscount Dumar, the Templar Order's local chapter led by Knight-Commander Meredith Stennard assume control of Kirkwall and rules it with an iron fist for the next three years, with mages in particular receiving heavy-handed and oppressive treatment. Meredith is challenged by First Enchanter Orsino, the head of the Kirkwall Circle organization, who attempts to rally public support for his cause. Although Hawke maintains a distance from the conflict between the factions, their recurring clashes grow increasingly violent, culminating in the Mage-Templar War following an act of terrorism committed by Anders against the Kirkwall Chantry. This forces Hawke to choose a side and intervene in the conflict. Hawke leaves the city-state and disappears following the deaths of both Orsino, who is revealed to be "O", and Meredith, who is revealed to be under the influence of a corrupting magical artifact unearthed by Hawke's expedition in the Deep Roads.

Dragon Age: Inquisition
In the 2014 video game Dragon Age: Inquisition, Hawke reemerges following the conclusion of the Mage-Templar War and the revelation of Corypheus' identity as the Elder One. Hawke assists the Inquisition in investigating the disappearance of the Grey Wardens, discovering that they were being manipulated by an agent of Corypheus into raising a demon army. Following a battle with the agent of Corypheus and his Grey Warden thralls, Hawke is unwittingly pulled into the Fade alongside the Inquisition party; depending on the player's choices, either Hawke or a Grey Warden ally would later sacrifice themselves to help the others escape the Fade.

Other appearances
A version of Hawke who is male and a mage was the focus of the marketing campaign behind Dragon Age II. Examples include the game's cover art, the cover art of magazines which previewed Dragon Age II, and numerous promotional or gameplay trailers.

Hawke appeared as a party member who could be recruited by the player in Dragon Age Legends, a Flash game which served as a tie-in to Dragon Age II. Several variants of Hawke appear as unlockable playable characters in the mobile title Heroes of Dragon Age.

A female version of Hawke is depicted on the illustrated cover of the 2018 novel Dragon Age: Hard in Hightown. Several characters from Dragon Age II, including Hawke's companions, are portrayed in the story though their names are altered.

Reception

Hawke's concept as a player character received a divisive reception prior to the release of Dragon Age II. 
Joe Juba from Game Informer welcomed BioWare's decision to offer a fully voiced protagonist like Hawke, which in his view provides better immersion and avoids scenarios where player characters may respond with fully written text dialogue, but visually give blank stares without saying a word in situations where they should be reactive to the non-player character. Conversely, Mike Fahey from Kotaku felt alienated by BioWare's decision, and claimed that many Dragon Age fans have expressed similar sentiments on the official BioWare forums. Fahey noted that while he did enjoy Commander Shepard's depiction in Mass Effect, he argued that Shepard never felt like an extension of himself compared to his Dragon Age character. In a separate article, Fahey praised the character design of the default female Hawke and said he would prefer to play that version of the character. Joseph Leray from Destructoid expressed concerns in a preview article about the then-upcoming Dragon Age II that the friendship-rivalry mechanic  may strip some tension out of Hawke's relationships with companion characters, and speculated that Hawke may not need to face any repercussions from companions at all if they could be forced into "compromising moral situations without their being able to lash out" since a rivalry path rewards the player anyway.

Hawke received a mixed reception following the release of Dragon Age II. Critics identified the points of contention which divided players to be the more personal and grounded nature of the game's narrative which is driven by Hawke's ten-year stay in Kirkwall, as well as the lack of choice to customize Hawke's origin story. The player character of Inquisition, the Inquisitor, was originally intended to be human-only; due to negative fan feedback towards Hawke being an exclusively human character, BioWare resolved to reintroduce racial choices for the Inquisitor prior to the completion of the project's development. In response to BioWare's announcement, Fraser Brown was appreciative of Hawke's origin story and believed that it was in line with the creative vision of Dragon Age II. In an opinion piece published by Game Developer which discussed negative fan reception towards Hawke, Katherine Cross rhetorically questioned whether "empathy with someone fleeing desperately for their lives with their family is really such a terrible thing to cultivate in a medium where standing in someone else's shoes is the whole point?".

Lauren Morton from PC Gamer felt that Hawke is a good example of a well-executed voiced player character: for Morton, the acting talents of both Boulton and Wyatt with the personality they brought to the character won her over, even though she appreciated the "wealth of choices" offered by the silent protagonist of Origins in terms of the freedom to roleplay.  Playing as a male version of the character, Rich McCormick also from PC Gamer observed that Hawke's tone "sits firmly on the plummy side of 'commanding', but very few of the dialogue options have him come across as anything less than mildly awesome", and that "he remains one suave bastard" regardless of the player's actual dialogue options. "Only very occasionally" did McCormick feel that he was neutered by his choices as Hawke in Dragon Age II, as the game's lack of a morality system encouraged a diverse choice of dialogue stances depending on specific circumstances without funneling players to role-play a certain personality. Jennifer Melzer from Comic Book Resources argued that a generally sarcastic Hawke is the best version to play for Dragon Age II, which she interprets as a coping mechanism and a manifestation of Hawke's inward struggle to deal with the extraordinary events that take place in Kirkwall. Becky Cunningham considers a female sarcastic Hawke to be one of her favorite video game characters due to BioWare's character writing and the "superlative voice acting by Jo Wyatt". Cunningham wished to see more video games which are willing to follow the example set by Dragon Age II, "subtly changing tone and even dialogue as the player shapes a character's personality". Eric Van Allen from Destructoid identified an overly dramatic response to a non-player character in the Mark of the Assassin downloadable content (DLC) pack to be a standout moment involving a sarcastic Hawke personality. 

In retrospect, some critics have focused on Hawke's characterization as a tragic figure who contributes pathos to the game's narrative, even though the character does not provide players with full agency over the story's outcome. Cross used the concept of tuche within the context of the Greek tragedy genre to analyze Hawke's circumstances, and that in her view, crafting a compelling story through the player character is not merely what the writer can add to the character power but also what can be taken away as a loss, which creates tension in a scenario "defined by limits on reach and ambition". Referencing the Schrödinger's cat thought experiment, Lianna Ruppert described Hawke as a flawed "Schrodinger's Hero" and an example of the game's "hidden perfection". For Ruppert, Hawke's story is special because of its disquieting realism, as "Hawke was never meant to live happily ever after" in spite of their attempts to avert pain and tragedy, even with all of the support and resources they have try to be available for the people they care about. She compared Hawke's circumstances to people in real life situations, where they have to be content with finding peace where they can and come to terms with the cards they were dealt with. Writing for Remeshed, Cora Walker summarized Hawke's character arc to be essentially about a person burdened with power and yet coping with loss in a world that does not make either scenario easy. Analyzing Hawke from a feminist perspective, Walker noted that she is always meant to make certain irreversible mistakes no matter what players choose, but what she learned from her arc as presented in Dragon Age II is that society should "let women have damage, let them make mistakes, and then let them trip, fall, and get back up again. Fraser Brown from PC Gamer was of the view that a lack of control by the player as Hawke, who is important but often powerless, in turn gives the world of Thedas and its characters more agency.

On the other hand, Dennis C. Scimeca from The Escapist said the choices he made by role-playing as a version of Hawke who tries to walk a middle line between the warring factions was undermined by Dragon Age II incomplete narrative which "fell apart" by its third act. He described being rushed into an ending that did not make any sense based on his character's choices, with the end result an "unmitigated disaster" as opposed to a "brilliant exercise in tragedy" in his opinion.  

Along with the Inquisitor, Hawke's transitory role as a series protagonist was highlighted by Kenneth Shepard from Fanbyte in his criticism of BioWare's decision to constantly switch protagonists with each new entry in the video game series. By not committing to a single protagonist in the serial fiction of Dragon Age and not properly concluding each of the protagonists' character arcs within the titles they serve as the lead character of, Shepard argued that this undermines the player's desire to be emotionally engaged or invested with the overarching storytelling of the franchise.

References

Further reading

Benzio, Kristin, Maker's Breath: Religion, Magic, and the 'Godless' World of BioWare's Dragon Age II, Heidelberg Journal of Religions on the Internet, Volume 5, 2014

Dragon Age characters
Fantasy video game characters
LGBT characters in video games
Role-playing video game characters
Video game characters introduced in 2011
Video game characters of selectable gender
Nobility characters in video games
Video game protagonists